Julio César Gaona (born 10 June 1973) is an Argentine former association football goalkeeper who last played for Sol de América of the Torneo Argentino A in Argentina.

References
 Profile at BDFA 

1973 births
Living people
Argentine footballers
Argentine expatriate footballers
Argentina under-20 international footballers
Association football goalkeepers
Atlético de Rafaela footballers
Crucero del Norte footballers
Quilmes Atlético Club footballers
Olimpo footballers
Sportivo Luqueño players
Atlético Junior footballers
Rosario Central footballers
Club Sol de América footballers
Unión Española footballers
Argentine Primera División players
Chilean Primera División players
Categoría Primera A players
Expatriate footballers in Chile
Expatriate footballers in Colombia
Expatriate footballers in Paraguay
Sportspeople from Misiones Province